Elsinoë randii is a species of fungus in the Elsinoaceae family. A plant pathogen, it was first formally described in 1938.

References 

Elsinoë
Fungi described in 1938
Fungal plant pathogens and diseases